K-11 is a  state highway in the U.S. state of Kansas, and uses parts of what was formerly K-14 before K-14 was realigned. K-11's southern terminus is at U.S. Route 54 (US-54) and US-400 west of Kingman, and the northern terminus is at K-61 west of Arlington.

Route description
K-11 begins at US-54 and US-400, which run concurrently east–west, between Kingman and Cunningham in north central Kingman County. The highway heads north along a section line road. The highway enters Reno County, where it crosses Goose Creek and Wolf Creek, both tributaries of the North Fork Ninnescah River. K-11 reaches its northern terminus west of the city of Arlington just south of a Union Pacific Railroad line at an intersection with K-61 between Partridge and Langdon.

History
K-11 was designated along what is now K-99 in 1927. In 1938, K-11 was renumbered to K-99 to match Oklahoma. In 1940, another K-11 was created from Kiowa to the Oklahoma border as a replacement of a part of K-8, which was truncated because of the extension of US 281 into Kansas. In December 1959, K-11 was cancelled and transferred back to K-8. In 2013, K-14 was realigned to the now defunct K-17, and K-11 took over a section of original K-14 alignment.

Major intersections

References

External links

Kansas Department of Transportation State Map
KDOT: Historic State Maps
Kansas Highways Routelog: K-11

011
Transportation in Kingman County, Kansas
Transportation in Reno County, Kansas